Bojangles is a 2001 American made-for-television biographical drama film that chronicles the life of entertainer Bill "Bojangles" Robinson (1878–1949). Robinson is played by Gregory Hines, who also served as an executive producer. Bojangles was produced by Darrick Productions and MGM Television for the Showtime premium cable network.

Synopsis
Starting with Robinson's funeral, including what looks like archival footage of the event, the film then plays out the biography in a straightforward manner as a flashback, both in color and black-and-white.

Cast
 Gregory Hines - Bill "Bojangles" Robinson
 Kimberly Elise - Fannie S. Clay
 Peter Riegert - Marty Forkins
 Maria Ricossa - Rae Samuel
 Savion Glover - Newcomer

Awards
Black Reel Awards (2002) 
Kimberly Elise – Best Supporting Actress
Image Award (2002) 
Gregory Hines – Outstanding Actor

Nominations
Emmy  Awards (2001) 
Gregory Hines – Outstanding Lead Actor
Henry LeTang – Outstanding Choreography
Image Awards (2002)
Outstanding Movie
Kimberly Elise – Outstanding Lead Actress
Golden Reel Award (2002) 
Best Sound Editing
Screen Actors Guild Awards (2002) 
Gregory Hines – Outstanding Performance by a Male Actor

References

External links

2001 television films
2001 films
2001 biographical drama films
African-American biographical dramas
Musical films based on actual events
Showtime (TV network) films
Films directed by Joseph Sargent
Films scored by Terence Blanchard
Biographical films about entertainers
American drama television films
2000s American films